Våle is a village in Tønsberg municipality, and former municipality, in Vestfold og Telemark county, Norway. Våle is a rural, agricultural area, with Kirkevoll/Brekkeåsen, Rånerudåsen, Svinevoll, Sørby and Gretteåsen as more dense housing areas. The administrative centre was Sørby.

The parish of Vaale was established as a municipality January 1, 1838 (see formannskapsdistrikt). According to the 1835 census the municipality had a population of 2,408. On 16 July 1873, an uninhabited part of Vaale was moved to Ramnes municipality following a royal resolution. In 1947 a part of Botne with 8 inhabitants was moved to Våle. On January 1, 2002 Våle was merged with Ramnes to form the new municipality Re, which on Januari 1, 2020 was merged into Tønsberg. In 1996 Våle had a population of 3,868.

Våle Church (Våle kirke) is located in Nord-Jarlsberg rural deanery. The Medieval church building was built in 1190 of stone and brick.

Våle is known for being the village where the Jarlsberg cheese first was produced. Famous residents of Våle include the author Kåre Holt (1916–1997).

The name and coat of arms 
Until 1921 the name was written "Vaale". The municipality (originally the parish) was named after the old farm Våle (Norse Válir), since the first church was built there. The name is the plural form of váll m (see Våler).

The municipality coat of arms was a mistletoe, since mistletoe grows in several places in the village. In Norse mythology Höðr killed Baldr with a mistletoe sprig, and Váli (Våle in Norwegian) has to avenge his death.

References

Other sources

1838 establishments in Norway
Populated places established in 1838
Populated places disestablished in 2002
Villages in Vestfold og Telemark
Former municipalities of Norway
Tønsberg